Goodbye Mom is a 2009 South Korean comedy drama film written and directed by Jeong Gi-hun in his feature debut. Starring Choi Kang-hee and Kim Young-ae, it depicts the story of an unsuccessful writer and her tumultuous relationship with her mother. A box office hit with more than 1.9 million admissions, Jeong also won Best Director for Asian New Talent Award at the 2010 Shanghai International Film Festival.

Cast
 Choi Kang-hee as Park Ae-ja
 Kim Young-ae as Choi Young-hee 
 Bae Soo-bin as Cheol-min
 Choi Il-hwa as Doctor Dong-pal 
 Seong byeong-sook as Fish market lady
 Sa Hyun-jin as Hyun-jin 
 Kim Jae-man as Min-seok
 Baek Seung-hwan as young Min-seok
 Jang Young-nam as Editor
 Jung Hye-sun as Female monk
 Shin Jung-geun as Joon-won
 Oh Yeon-ah as Min-jung

Awards and nominations

References

External links 
 
 
 

2009 films
2009 comedy-drama films
2000s Korean-language films
Showbox films
South Korean comedy-drama films
Films directed by Jeong Gi-hun
2000s South Korean films